The Sandwater near Simonswolde (in the municipality of Ihlow) in the north German district of Aurich is a shallow fen  lake on the edge of the geest and is one of the few remaining, preserved, natural "inland seas" in East Frisia. The lake was formed probably during the warm climatic period of the Atlantic (period) about 5000 years ago, then disappeared temporarily after land uplifting and climate changes, only to reappear about 2000 years ago.

Since 1973 the Sandwater and several surrounding wetland areas with a total area of  have been designated as a nature reserve. The extensive reed beds have an important function in providing nesting and feeding grounds for reed breeders and waterfowl. Here  large carpets of floating plants - the White and Yellow Water Lilies - dominate the scene, and also accelerate the accumulation of mud and silt. Since the lake was dyked at the beginning of the 1960s and the surrounding area drained, the original hydrology and eutrophication of the lake has changed considerably. Previously the Sandwater had a particularly rich variety of underwater flora which produced relatively nutrient-rich, clean water  (c.f. its name!), for example it contained many rare species of pondweed as well as  von Floating Water-plantain (Luronium natans) and Lesser Water-plantain (Baldellia ranunculoides). Today plants such as Frogbit, Water Violet, Flowering Rush and Arrowhead may be seen.

Sources 
van Dieken, Jan (1970). Beiträge zur Flora Nordwestdeutschlands unter besonderer Berücksichtigung Ostfrieslands. Verlag C. L. Mettcker & Söhne, Jever.  (possibly out of print)

External links 
www.nordwestreisemagazin.de/sandwater Further information about Sandwater 

Lakes of Lower Saxony
Aurich (district)
Nature reserves in Lower Saxony